NJHL may refer to:
National Junior Hockey League, Russia
Noralta Junior Hockey League, Alberta, Canada
NorMan Junior Hockey League, Manitoba, Canada
Northern Junior Hockey League, United States
North West Junior Hockey League, Alberta/British Columbia, Canada
Northwest Junior Hockey League (Manitoba), Canada